Marcel Boigegrain (born c.1929) was a French coxswain. He competed at the 1948 Summer Olympics in London with the men's coxed four where they were eliminated in the semi-finals.

References

External links

Year of birth unknown
Possibly living people
French male rowers
Olympic rowers of France
Rowers at the 1948 Summer Olympics
Coxswains (rowing)
European Rowing Championships medalists